Armistead Thomson Mason (August 4, 1787February 6, 1819), the son of Stevens Thomson Mason, was a U.S. Senator from Virginia from 1816 to 1817. Mason was also the second-youngest person to ever serve in the US Senate, at the age of 28 and 5 months, even though the age requirement for the US Senate in the constitution is 30 years old.

Early life and education
He was born at Armisteads in Louisa County, Virginia, graduated from the College of William and Mary in 1807 and engaged in agricultural pursuits until he became colonel of Virginia Volunteers in the War of 1812 and subsequently brigadier general of Virginia Militia.

Political career
He was elected as a Republican to the United States Senate to fill the vacancy caused by the resignation of William Branch Giles, despite being constitutionally underage for the office. Mason served from January 3, 1816, to March 4, 1817. He then moved to Loudoun County, Virginia where he was an unsuccessful candidate for election to the Fifteenth Congress (1817). It was a bitter campaign that gave rise to several duels: Mason himself was later killed in a duel with his second cousin, John Mason McCarty, at Bladensburg Duelling Field, Maryland, as a result of this campaign. He is buried in the churchyard of the Episcopal Church at Leesburg, Virginia.

Marriage and children
Mason married on 1 May 1817 to Charlotte Eliza Taylor (died 1846) at Dr. Charles Cocke's in Albemarle County, Virginia. The couple had one son:

Stevens Thomson Mason (1819–14 June 1847)

Relations
Armistead Thomson Mason was the grandnephew of George Mason (1725–1792); grandson of Thomson Mason (1733–1785); son of Mary Elizabeth "Polly" Armistead Mason (1760–1825) and Stevens Thomson Mason (1760–1803); nephew of John Thomson Mason (1765–1824); second cousin of Thomson Francis Mason (1785–1838) and James Murray Mason (1798–1871); brother-in-law of William Taylor Barry (1784–1835); brother of John Thomson Mason (1787–1850); uncle of Stevens Thomson Mason (1811–1843); and first cousin of John Thomson Mason, Jr. (1815–1873).

Ancestry

References

External links
Armistead Thomson Mason. Find a Grave.

|-

1787 births
1819 deaths
18th-century American Episcopalians
19th-century American Episcopalians
American militiamen in the War of 1812
American planters
American slave owners
American politicians killed in duels
College of William & Mary alumni
Deaths by firearm in Maryland
Democratic-Republican Party United States senators
Duelling fatalities
Mason family
People from Loudoun County, Virginia
People from Louisa County, Virginia
People from Virginia in the War of 1812
United States senators from Virginia
Virginia Democratic-Republicans
United States senators who owned slaves